Anna Vladimirovna Bogomolnaia is a Russian economist specializing in microeconomics and game theory. She is a professor in economics at the Adam Smith School of Economics and Finance of the University of Glasgow, and chief research fellow of the International Laboratory for Game Theory and Decision Making at the Higher School of Economics in Russia.

Education and career
After earning a master's degree in mathematics at Saint Petersburg State University in 1989, Bogomolnaia went to the Autonomous University of Barcelona for doctoral studies in economics.

After earning her doctorate, she worked at the University of Nottingham, became an assistant professor at Southern Methodist University, and earned tenure at Rice University in 2005. She took her positions at the University of Glasgow and the Higher School of Economics in 2013 and 2015 respectively.

Contributions
Bogomolnaia is known for her work on coalitions and on randomized solutions to assignment problems. With Hervé Moulin she formulated the probabilistic-serial procedure for solving the fair random assignment problem. With Matthew O. Jackson she introduced the concept of hedonic games to model coalition-forming in multiplayer games.

References

External links

Year of birth missing (living people)
Living people
Russian economists
British economists
Russian women economists
Saint Petersburg State University alumni
Autonomous University of Barcelona alumni
Southern Methodist University faculty
Rice University faculty
Academics of the University of Glasgow
Academic staff of the Higher School of Economics
Fair division researchers